The 185 series was an electric multiple unit (EMU) train type operated by the East Japan Railway Company (JR East) primarily on mid-distance limited express services centering on Tokyo.

The class is broadly divided into two variants: 185-0 series for use south-west of Tokyo, and 185-200 series originally for use north of Tokyo.

185-0 series
The 185 series was primarily intended to replace ageing 153 series EMUs used on Izu express trains from Tokyo to the Izu Peninsula. The requirement was also for a "general-purpose" train that could also be used occasionally on local services.

A total of eight 10-car sets (sets A1 to A8, including two Green cars) and seven 5-car sets (sets C1 to C7) were built between 1979 and 1980 (115 vehicles in total), and delivered to Tamachi depot. Initially, they were phased in on Izu express trains from March 1981, working alongside (and sometimes coupled with) the older 153 series trains. In October 1981, the Izu express was upgraded to become the Odoriko limited express, with all trains formed of 185 series sets.

The Tamachi Depot fleet was transferred to Ōmiya Depot from the start of the 16 March 2013 timetable revision.

Formations

10-car sets A1 to A8
The 10-car sets A1 to A8 are formed as follows, with car 1 at the Izu end.

Cars 3, 7, and 9 each have one lozenge-type pantograph.

5-car sets C1 to C7
The 5-car sets C1 to C7 are formed as follows, with car 11 at the Izu end.

Car 14 is equipped with a lozenge-type pantograph.

Refurbishment
Between 1993 and 1998, the original Japanese-style toilets in cars 1, 5, and 10 of the A sets, and cars 11 and 15 of the C sets were replaced with western-style toilets. In 1998, the Green car seats were upgraded. Then, from 1999 to 2002, all sets underwent refurbishment, which primarily involved replacing the original flip-over seating in standard-class cars with rotating/reclining seats to bring the level of accommodation in line with other limited express rolling stock. Externally, the sets were repainted from the original white livery with diagonal green stripes to white with "Shōnan" green and orange blocks.

Interior

185-200 series

Sixteen 7-car sets (112 vehicles) including one Green car were delivered between 1980 and 1981 to Shin-Maebashi depot to replace ageing 165 series EMUs. Compared with the earlier 185-0 series sets, these had cold-region specifications, including snow-resistant brakes, front-end horn covers, and were able to operate over the Usui Pass between Yokokawa and Karuizawa in conjunction with JNR Class EF63 electric locomotives. Livery was white with a single green band running the length of each car below the windows. The first trains were introduced on express services such as the Kusatsu and Karuizawa from December 1981.

The Ōmiya-based sets are used on Kusatsu (Ueno - Manza-Kazawaguchi), Minakami (Ueno - Minakami), and Akagi (Ueno - Maebashi) limited express services, as well as Weekend Akagi services. The Tamachi-based B sets are used on Ohayō Tochigi (Shinjuku - Kuroiso/Utsunomiya) and Hometown Tochigi (Shinjuku - Kuroiso) services as well as Odoriko and Hamakaiji limited express services.

From March 2013, the "OM" sets were reversed and reformed with the Green car moved from Car 6 to Car 4 to match the "B" sets transferred from Tamachi Depot. As of 1 April 2013, sets OM03, OM06, OM08, and OM09 remain unchanged.

Formations

7-car sets OM01 to OM09
The 7-car sets OM01 to OM09 are formed as follows, with car 1 at the south (Ueno/Izu) end.

Cars 3 and 6 each have one lozenge-type pantograph.

7-car sets B1 to B7
The 7-car sets B1 to B7 (former Tamachi sets) are formed as follows, with car 1 at the south (Ueno/Izu) end.

Cars 3 and 6 each have one lozenge-type pantograph.

Original "OM" 7-car sets
The 7-car "OM" sets based at Ōmiya were formed as follows prior to March 2013, with car 1 at the south (Ueno) end. , sets OM03, OM06, OM08, and OM09 remain unchanged.

Cars 2 and 4 each have one lozenge-type pantograph.

Shinkansen Relay
These services ended in March 1985 when the shinkansen line was extended to Ueno. Four sets were then transferred to Tamachi depot for use on Odoriko services. These sets were reformed with the Green car moved from car 6 to car 4, and were repainted with diagonal green stripes to match the 185-0 series sets based at Tamachi depot. A further three sets were transferred to Tamachi between 1988 and 1991, becoming sets B1 to B7.

Refurbishment

Between 1993 and 1998, the original Japanese-style toilets in cars 1, 4, and 7 of the Tamachi-based B sets were replaced with western-style toilets.

The nine sets remaining at Shin-Maebashi depot were all refurbished between September 1995 and November 1996. Refurbishment involved replacing the original flip-over seating in standard-class cars with rotating/reclining seats. Externally, the sets were repainted in white with yellow/grey/red blocks intended to represent the Jōmō mountain range together with "EXPRESS 185" markings below the windows.

In March 2006, the Shin-Maebashi-based sets were transferred to Ōmiya depot, becoming sets OM01 to OM09.

Between March and June 1996, three of the 7-car sets based at Tamachi (B3 to B5) were fitted with ATC equipment for use on the Keihin-Tōhoku Line and Negishi Line when operating on Hamakaiji services. These sets were upgraded with D-ATC equipment between January 2006 and March 2007.

Interior

Reliveried sets

Shōnan-livery OM03

In September 2010, 7-car set OM03 was repainted into the Shōnan colour scheme of orange and green (never previously carried by this type) to recreate the appearance of the early 80 series EMUs, as part of the 50th anniversary celebrations of the Kusatsu limited express service scheduled for October of that year.

Original Odoriko-livery A8

In July 2011, 10-car Tamachi-based set A8 was repainted into the original Odoriko colour scheme of white with green diagonal stripes at Ōmiya Works.

Original Odoriko-livery C1
In June 2012, 5-car Tamachi-based set C1 was repainted into the original Odoriko colour scheme of white with green diagonal stripes at Ōmiya Works.

Amagi-livery OM08

In February 2012, 7-car set OM08 was repainted into the JNR colour scheme of beige and maroon (never previously carried by this type) at Ōmiya Works to recreate the appearance of the early 157 series EMUs used on Amagi services.

Withdrawal
East Japan Railway Company has recently announced that all 185 series sets will be scrapped by 2022. Currently, they are serving as temporary trains.

References

External links

 JR East 185 series Odoriko 
 JR East 185 series Akagi/Kusatsu/Minakami 

Electric multiple units of Japan
East Japan Railway Company
Train-related introductions in 1981
1500 V DC multiple units of Japan